Puente Alsina is a 1935  Argentine musical film directed and written by José A. Ferreyra. It is a tango musical and premiered on 6 August 1935 in Buenos Aires.

Plot 
Lidia is a woman who recently rejected his boyfriend, Alfredo's proposal to her. She then leaves and goes to a river afterwards. While standing at the river, she falls in. Edmundo, one of Lidia's coworkers, rescues her from the water.

Edmundo takes Lidia to her house, as she is unconscious. Her boyfriend, Alfredo, begins worrying. Not knowing where she is, Alfredo hires a detective to locate Lidia.

Main cast 

 Miguel Gómez Bao
 Alberto Bello
 Pierina Dealessi
 José Gola
 José Mazilli
 Rafael Salvatore
 Delia Urruty

Reception 
The film was considered unsuccessful due to the plot and poorly written dialogue.

References

External links

1935 films
Argentine musical films
1930s Spanish-language films
Argentine black-and-white films
1935 musical films
Tango films
Films directed by José A. Ferreyra
1930s dance films
1930s Argentine films